Drummond Street may refer to:

 Drummond Street, Edinburgh, a street in the Old Town of Edinburgh, United Kingdom
 Drummond Street, London, a street in Camden, London, United Kingdom
 Drummond Street, Montreal, a street in downtown Montreal, Canada
 Drummond Street, Melbourne, a street in the inner suburb of Carlton in Melbourne, Australia